Connected is the first studio album by the Foreign Exchange, a hip hop group consisting of American rapper Phonte from Little Brother and Dutch producer Nicolay. It was released on BBE on August 24, 2004.

Their group name comes from how they produced their songs: Nicolay would produce a beat in the Netherlands and send the beat to Phonte through instant messaging, email, and traditional mail to lay down the vocals. Phonte would return the product, so Nicolay could then master the track; they did not meet until after the album was completed.

Pitchfork placed it at number 22 on the "Top 50 Albums of 2004" list. In 2015, it was ranked at number 86 on Facts "100 Best Indie Hip-Hop Records of All Time" list.

Track listing

Personnel
 Phonte – vocals
 Nicolay – production
 Yahzarah – vocals (on "Foreign Exchange Title Theme", "Sincere", and "End Theme")
 Von Pea – vocals (on "Von Sees")
 Joe Scudda – vocals (on "Raw Life")
 Quartermaine – vocals (on "Hustle, Hustle")
 C.A.L.I.B.E.R. – vocals (on "Hustle, Hustle")
 Rapper Big Pooh – vocals (on "Let's Move", "Nic's Groove", and "Happiness")
 Median – vocals (on "Be Alright" and "All That You Are")
 Frank Ford – vocals (on "Be Alright")
 Kenn Starr – vocals (on "The Answer")
 Oddisee – vocals (on "The Answer")
 Sean Boog – vocals (on "The Answer")
 Darien Brockington – vocals (on "Come Around", "All That You Are", and "Call")

References

External links
 

2004 debut albums
The Foreign Exchange albums
Barely Breaking Even albums
Albums produced by Nicolay (musician)